Tajik Americans are Americans who trace their origin to Tajikistan. The majority of Tajik Americans are ethnic Tajiks.

Demography 
About 6,000 Tajiks live in the US. Most reside in New York, California and Nebraska, as well as in Washington, D.C. Many come to the U.S. to study and work. Most Tajiks who emigrated to work get the right of permanent residence.  Most second-generation Tajiks can speak their original language, while those of mixed descent mainly speak English. Many marry other Tajiks because of their cultural affinity.

Associations 
Several Tajik associations operate in the U.S. One is the American-Tajik Association, established in Brooklyn, whose goal is to unite the Tajik diaspora, giving them a forum to gather and celebrate their culture. 

In May 2012, the Tajik American Cultural Association (TACA) was founded by Tajik local volunteers Vladimir Fedorenko, Anvar Samadzoda, Akobir Akhmedov and Faridun Nazarov in Fairfax, Virginia as a non-profit, non-governmental, cultural, professional, and educational organization. The mission of TACA is to promote and facilitate intercultural understanding and cooperation by organizing educational and cultural programs that focus on issues concerning the Tajik American community.   In addition, TACA strives to address the needs of the Tajik community in America. TACA believes that building cultural bridges among Tajik and American communities is needed and aims to promote further integration, encourage cooperation and establish close relations with other US communities.

Notable people
 Malika Kalontarova, dancer
 Rus Yusupov, businessman

See also

 Central Asians in the United States
 Tajikistan–United States relations

References 

American people of Tajikistani descent
Central Asian American
Tajikistani American